Soupe Opéra (often referred to in English as Soup Opera) is a French children's television programme. Animated using stop motion by a French studio called Marlou Films, the show features fruits and vegetables turning themselves into different creatures and objects. The name of the series is a pun on the term "Soap Opera". A total of 26 two-minute episodes were made. In France, the series aired on the France 3 channel.

Internationally, Soupe Opéra aired in Australia on ABC1 and its sister channel, ABC2, during the ABC 4 Kids line-up. In the UK, it aired on ITV during its CITV children's block and later on the CITV channel. In the United States and Latin America, the series aired on Cartoon Network as part of its Small World anthology series, which featured foreign-made shorts.

Visuals
The title sequence of each episode shows a fruits and vegetables slot machine, with accompanying sound effects. Two  variations of this title sequence exist, with a slight variation to the visual design of the slot machine and the jackpot either being three star fruits or a globe artichoke, an endive and a peach.  

During the episode, various food objects (typically fruit and vegetables) spontaneously exit a basket, moving by themselves, and cut themselves up to form animals and objects. The animals formed then perform actions, such as eating the leftover food. In some episodes, the food that comes out is not fruit or vegetables, such as an egg that is hard boiled, a packet of chips or a bag of baking soda. Non-food items can also come out of the basket too, such as a pot and portable gas stove. Many of the animals that are made became recurring characters on another show created by Marlou Films, Les animaux des quatre saisons (The four seasons animals,) which follows the lives of various animals who are all made out of fruits and vegetables themselves. 

The show is also very similar in style to Poubelles (Dustbins,) another Marlou Films production. Instead of fruit and vegetables coming out of a basket, the show features rubbish coming out of a bin to create an animal.

Soundtrack
Soupe Opera features a distinctive soundtrack by French artists C.I.P/Garlo. The score consists of two pieces of music, re-used every episode in the same order. The first track is played during the stop motion scenes, and features four voices singing in an a cappella fashion, with each segment starting off with a distinct female soprano opera voice singing the words 'Soupe Opéra.'  The voices are a mixture of live performed singing, beatboxing, and sampled vocal sounds played back on a synthesiser. The second track is a synth funk arrangement of the same tune played over the credits.

Following
The show developed somewhat of a cult following, particularly in France and Australia, where it was regularly played on ABC in the mid-1990s and 2000s. The whole series of 26 episodes have been posted on YouTube by Marlou Films.

References

External links
Soupe Opéra on IMDb
ABC for Kids
Marlou Films' YouTube channel

1990s French animated television series
2000s French animated television series
1991 French television series debuts
2000 French television series endings
French children's animated television series
Stop-motion animated television series